First-seeded Margaret Smith was the five-time defending champion, and successfully defended her title, defeating Maria Bueno 5–7, 6–4, 5–2 ret. in the final to win the women's singles tennis title at the 1965 Australian Championships.

Seeds
The seeded players are listed below. Margaret Smith is the champion; others show the round in which they were eliminated.

  Margaret Smith (champion)
  Maria Bueno (finalist)
  Lesley Turner (third round)
  Billie-Jean Moffitt (semifinals)
  Judy Tegart (quarterfinals)
  Carole Graebner (quarterfinals)
  Robyn Ebbern (quarterfinals)
  Ann Jones (second round)
  Madonna Schacht (second round)
  Gail Sherriff (second round)
  Jill Blackman (third round)
  Helen Gourlay (third round)
  Norma Baylon (third round)
  Deidre Keller (second round)
  Annette Van Zyl (semifinals)
  Christine Truman (third round)

Draw

Key
 Q = Qualifier
 WC = Wild card
 LL = Lucky loser
 r = Retired

Finals

Earlier rounds

Section 1

Section 2

Section 3

Section 4

External links
 1965 Australian Championships on ITFtennis.com, the source for this draw

1965 in women's tennis
1965
1965 in Australian tennis
1965 in Australian women's sport